The Mayor of Rimini is an elected politician who, along with the Rimini's City Council, is accountable for the strategic government of Rimini in Emilia-Romagna, Italy. 

The current Mayor is Jamil Sadegholvaad, a member of the Democratic Party, who took office on 7 October 2021.

Overview
According to the Italian Constitution, the Mayor of Rimini is member of the City Council.

The Mayor is elected by the population of Rimini, who also elect the members of the City Council, controlling the Mayor's policy guidelines and is able to enforce his resignation by a motion of no confidence. The Mayor is entitled to appoint and release the members of his government.

Since 1995 the Mayor is elected directly by Rimini's electorate: in all mayoral elections in Italy in cities with a population higher than 15,000 the voters express a direct choice for the mayor or an indirect choice voting for the party of the candidate's coalition. If no candidate receives at least 50% of votes, the top two candidates go to a second round after two weeks. The election of the City Council is based on a direct choice for the candidate with a preference vote: the candidate with the majority of the preferences is elected. The number of the seats for each party is determined proportionally.

1815–1946

Republic of Italy (since 1946)

City Council election (1946–1995)
From 1946 to 1995, the Mayor of Rimini was elected by the City Council.

Direct election (since 1995)
Since 1995, under provisions of new local administration law, the Mayor of Rimini is chosen by direct election, originally every four, and since 2001 every five years.

Notes

Timeline

See also
 Timeline of Rimini

References

Bibliography

External links
 
 

Rimini
 
Politics of Emilia-Romagna
Rimini